Saint-Léon-le-Grand is a parish municipality in the Maskinongé Regional County Municipality in the Mauricie region of the province of Quebec, Canada.

Demographics 

Population trend:
 Population in 2021: 863 (2016 to 2021 population change: -7%)
 Population in 2016: 928 
 Population in 2011: 992 
 Population in 2006: 965
 Population in 2001: 966
 Population in 1996: 955
 Population in 1991: 925

Mother tongue:
 English as first language: 0%
 French as first language: 100%
 English and French as first language: 0%
 Other as first language: 0%

References 

Parish municipalities in Quebec
Incorporated places in Mauricie